is a small island located in Hachinohe, Aomori, in the Tōhoku region of northern Japan. Part of the Tanesashi Coast, it was incorporated into the Sanriku Fukkō National Park from May 2013.

Geography
The highest point of the island measures  in elevation. Although called it is an island, it is connected to the mainland by a causeway constructed in 1942 so that people may walk to it from the shore.

Important Bird Area
The island is noted as a nesting ground for Black-tailed gulls and has been protected as a National Natural Monument of Japan since 1922. It has also been recognised as an Important Bird Area (IBA) by BirdLife International. The sound of the  umi-neko at Hachinohe was selected by the Ministry of the Environment as one of the 100 Soundscapes of Japan.

Kabushima Shrine

  is a small Shinto shrine  located on Kabushima island.  The shrine is a branch of the Itsukushima Shrine and is dedicated to Benzaiten. According to shrine legend, it was established in 1269 by local fishermen. The shrine burned completely down on 5 November 2015, but it was rebuilt and expanded at the cost of 5 billion yen. The shrine reopened on 26 March 2020 after a small reopening ceremony. The ceremony was scaled down due to the COVID-19 pandemic.  The main festival of the shrine is held on the third Sunday of April.

References

External links

Hachinohe City tourist information
  Official website 
 Kabushima on Nippon-Kichi

Shinto shrines in Aomori Prefecture
Islands of Aomori Prefecture
Natural monuments of Japan
Hachinohe
Tourist attractions in Aomori Prefecture
Important Bird Areas of Japan
Seabird colonies